Adolf Kabo (3 March 1960 – 4 April 2021) was an Indonesian footballer who played for the Indonesian national team.

Career
Born in 1960, in Manokwari, Indonesia, Kabo played for hometown club Perseman Manokwari between 1983 and 1988. As a result of his performances with Perseman Manokwari, Kabo received a call up from the Indonesia national team to play at the 1985 Brunei Merdeka Games. A year later, on 21 September 1986, Kabo scored in a 1–1 draw with Qatar at the 1986 Asian Games in South Korea.

References

1960 births
2021 deaths
People from Manokwari
Association football forwards
Perseman Manokwari players
Perserikatan players
Indonesian footballers
Indonesia international footballers
Footballers at the 1986 Asian Games
Asian Games competitors for Indonesia